José Enrique "Quique" Meléndez Ortiz is a Puerto Rican politician from the New Progressive Party (PNP). He served as member of the Senate of Puerto Rico from 1993 to 2001.

Meléndez was elected to the Senate of Puerto Rico in the 1992 general election. He represented the District of Guayama. Meléndez was reelected at the 1996 general election.

Meléndez ran for a third term at the 2000 general elections, but was defeated by the candidates of the PPD.

Personal life

Meléndez is married to Elba M. Ortiz Santiago. He has at least one son, José E. Meléndez Ortiz, Jr., who is serving as a member of the Puerto Rico House of Representatives since 2011.

See also
21st Senate of Puerto Rico

References

Living people
New Progressive Party (Puerto Rico) politicians
People from Coamo, Puerto Rico
Members of the Senate of Puerto Rico
Year of birth missing (living people)